Desmond De-Graft Paitoo (born 21 August 1969) is a Ghanaian politician who currently serves as the Member of Parliament for the Gomoa East Constituency.

Early life and education 
Desmond De-Graft was born on 21 August 1969 and hails from Gomoa Dasum in the Central Region of Ghana. Desmond De-Graft had his MSLC in 1987, City and Guild Intermediate in Mechanical Engineering in 1991 and his Degree in Supply Chain Management (Procurement) in 2018.

Career 
Desmond De-Graft is the Chief Executive Officer (CEO) of Desreen Shipping and Logistics. He is a freight forwarder.

Political life 
Desmond De-Graft is a member of the National Democratic Congress. He contested and won the NDC parliamentary primaries for Gomoa East Constituency in the Central Region of Ghana.

2016 election 
In the 2016 Ghanaian general election, he lost the Gomoa East Constituency parliamentary seat to the New Patriotic Party parliamentary candidate Kojo Asemanyi. He lost with 15,010 votes making 42.5% of the total votes cast whilst Kojo had 17,654 votes making 50.0% of the total votes cast, an Independent candidate Marcus Yaw Danso who had 1,604 votes making 4.5% of the total votes cast, Eunice Assuman of PPP who also had 920 votes making 2.6% of the total votes cast and Godfred Kumedzro Cudjo of CPP had 105 votes making 0.3% of the total votes cast.

2020 election 
Desmond De-Graft won the parliamentary seat for the Gomoa East Constituency during the 2020 Ghanaian general elections on the ticket of the National Democratic Congress with 36,637 votes making 49.46% of the total votes cast to join the Eighth (8th) Parliament of the Fourth Republic of Ghana against Kojo Asemanyi of the New Patriotic Party who had 135,873 votes making 48.42% of the total votes cast, Samuel Kofi Essel of GUM who had 1,397 votes making 1.89% of the total votes cast and Emmanuel Otchere of UPP who also had 173 votes making 0.23% of the total votes cast.

Committees 
Desmond De-Graft is a member of the House Committee. He is also a member of the Food, Agriculture and Cocoa Affairs Committee of the Eighth (8th) Parliament of the Fourth Republic of Ghana.

Personal life 
Desmond De-Graft is a Christian

Philanthropy 
In January 2022, he pledged to support the construction of a health facility with hospital furniture and other items at Dampase in the Central Region.

Controversy 
In November 2020, De-Graft was sued by Akwasi Adjetey, a businessman for allegedly collapsing his business.

References 

Living people
1969 births
National Democratic Congress (Ghana) politicians
Ghanaian MPs 2021–2025